Qaqazan-e Sharqi Rural District is a rural district (dehestan) in the Central District of Takestan County, Qazvin Province, Iran. At the 2006 census, its population was 12,890, in 2,930 families.  The rural district has 19 villages.

References 

Rural Districts of Qazvin Province
Takestan County